The 2021 IIHF World Championship Division I was scheduled to be an international ice hockey tournament run by the International Ice Hockey Federation.

The Group A tournament would have been held in Ljubljana, Slovenia from 9 to 15 May and the Group B tournament in Katowice, Poland from 26 April to 2 May 2021.

On 18 November 2020, both tournaments were cancelled due to the COVID-19 pandemic.

Group A tournament

Participants

Standings

Group B tournament

Participants

Standings

References

2020
Division I
2021 IIHF World Championship Division I
2021 IIHF World Championship Division I
Sports competitions in Ljubljana
Sports competitions in Katowice
2021 in Slovenian sport
2021 in Polish sport
April 2021 sports events in Europe
May 2021 sports events in Europe
Ice hockey events cancelled due to the COVID-19 pandemic